, also read as "kokuzō" or "kunitsuko", were officials in ancient Japan at the time of the Yamato court.

Yamato period

Kuni no miyatsuko governed small territories, although the location, names, and borders of the provinces remain unclear. Kuni no miyatsuko were appointed by and remained under the jurisdiction of the Yamato Court, but over time the position became hereditary. Kuni no miyatsuko carried kabane honoric names bestowed by the Yamato Court, commonly "kimi" (君) or "atae" (直). Prestigious Kuni no miyatsuko were called "omi" (臣).

Taika Reform

The office of kuni no miyatsuko was abolished in the Taika Reforms in 645 and the former administrative ‘’kuni’’ provinces were formally reorganized under the ritsuryō system. The provinces became ruled by new officials called kuni no mikotomochi, or more commonly, . Gunji were appointed from powerful regional kuni no miyatsuko families, appointed for life, and the position became hereditary. The Kuni no miyatsuko were now in charge of spiritual and religious affairs, specifically the Shintō rites of each province. The kuni no miyatsuko, now in the office of gunji, often sided with peasants against the ruling kokushi elite. The gunji position, however, was abolished with the establishment of the shōen system in the early Heian period.

References

 
Ancient Japan